David Czyszczon (born 4 September 1981 in Racibórz) is a Polish-German footballer who plays for Rot-Weiss Essen II.

Career
In summer 2009, he moved to Sportfreunde Lotte. In summer 2012, he joined SC Wiedenbrück 2000.

Czyszczon joined BV Herne-Süd in July 2015, after the termination of his contract at SC Wiedenbrück 2000.

Statistics

References

External links
David Czyszczon at FuPa

1981 births
Living people
German footballers
Polish footballers
Polish emigrants to Germany
VfL Bochum players
VfL Bochum II players
Rot-Weiss Essen players
Sportfreunde Lotte players
2. Bundesliga players
People from Racibórz
SC Wiedenbrück 2000 players
Sportspeople from Silesian Voivodeship
Association football defenders
DSC Wanne-Eickel players
VfB Hüls players